Ronald Harrison (15 May 1923 – July 2004) was an English footballer who played in the Football League as an inside forward for Darlington and Gateshead, with whom he began his senior career as an amateur during the Second World War. He also played non-league football for Ashington.

References

1923 births
2004 deaths
People from Hebburn
Footballers from Tyne and Wear
English footballers
Association football inside forwards
Gateshead F.C. players
Darlington F.C. players
Ashington A.F.C. players
English Football League players